The River Divelish is a Dorset watercourse of that rises on the north slope of Bulbarrow Hill, near to the source of the Devil's Brook. It is a tributary of the River Stour, which it joins upstream of Sturminster Newton. The Stour, in turn, discharges into the English Channel.

Toponymy

See also
List of rivers of England

References

External links

Divelish